Ara Nazhika Neram (Half an Hour Only) is a Malayalam novel written by Parappurath in 1967. One of the most famous novels by the prolific author, it won the Kerala Sahitya Akademi Award and Sahitya Pravartaka Award. Set in the Central Travancore region in the 1960s, the story revolved round an Orthodox Christian family headed by Kunjenachan, a ninety-year-old patriarch who lives his life by The Book. The novel had a highly successful film adaptation with the same title in 1970. The film was directed by K. S. Sethumadhavan and featured Prem Nazir, Kottarakkara Sreedharan Nair, Sathyan, K. P. Ummer, Adoor Bhasi, Ragini, Sheela and Ambika Sukumaran.

Main characters
 Kunjonachan, a ninety-year-old patriarch at death's door
 Keevarechan, Pilipochan, Mathukutty, Kunjucherukkan - Kunjenachan's sons
 Shivaramakurup (Kuruppachan) - Kunjonachan's friend
 Rajan - Mathukutty's son
 Deenamma - Mathukutty's second wife
 Kuttiyamma - Kunjenachan's grand daughter
 Shanthamma - Rajan's wife
 Achen from Kozhencherry

Award
In 1996 Odia translation of same Book "Muhan-Sanjha" by Jiwan Pani got Sahitya Akademi Translation Award.

References

1967 novels
20th-century Indian novels
Malayalam novels
Indian novels adapted into films
Novels set in Kerala
Kerala Sahitya Akademi Award-winning works
1967 Indian novels